The Cavalry Regiment El Rey is the oldest cavalry regiment in the Spanish Army, distinguishing itself on several occasions during the Peninsular War. They are best known for their charge at the Battle of Talavera where they dealt the decisive blow against General Jean François Leval's German Division.

History 

The Cavalry Regiment El Rey is Spain's oldest cavalry regiment, founded in 1538 under the reign of King Charles I of Spain, and as such bore the title The King's in the Spanish Army. During the Napoleonic era it was considered as one of the best Spanish regiments and it distinguished itself during the Spanish War of Independence, frequently being commented as performing very well in those years. In 1807 the regiment was assigned to Marqúes de la Romana's Division of the North. In 1808 it joined the fight against France after evacuating from Denmark.

Upon arrival in Cantabria the cavalrymen marched to Extremadura where they were to collect horses, thus avoiding the defeat that fell upon Romana's division at Espinosa de los Monteros. In 1809 the regiment would see much action while serving in Gregorio García de la Cuesta y Fernández de Celis' Army of Extremadura, as part of General José de Henestrosa's 1st Cavalry Division. It would fight at the Battle of Talavera, where they captured four French cannons and would be highly praised in Cuesta's report.

Its intrepid attack and destruction of a column of enemy infantry. Its colonel, Don José Maria de Lastra, was wounded during the charge and was succeeded with valour by lieutenant colonel Don Rafael Valparda. Captain Don Francisco de Sierra gained much distinction by taking a cannon while vanquishing its defenders; Ensign Don Pablo de Cataneo, of 16 years of age, slew four Frenchmen, and all officers and men of the regiment manifested proof of its valour and discipline.

The regiment would see action again at the Battle of Arzobispo, under the command of José María de la Cueva, 14th Duke of Alburquerque, in which the cannons that the regiment captured at Talavera were lost.

Later on in the year of 1809 the regiment saw action in the Army of La Mancha under General Juan Carlos de Aréizaga, in General Juan de Bermuy's 1st Cavalry Division, at the Battle of Ocaña. The battle was a disaster for the Spanish Army as large numbers of the well trained pre-1808 veterans had been killed or captured, leaving the army with a great need for more trained men; the defeat also leading to the second Spanish attempt to re-capture Madrid being halted.

In 1815 a review from the Estado Militar de España placed the regiment as one of the units that were to remain as part of the regular army after the Peninsular War ended. This review was normally done annually, however due to the chaotic state of Spanish politics during the war it had been difficult to make a full review of the Spanish Army until peace was made.

In 1898 the regiment saw service in the Spanish–American War in Cuba, around the main area of the conflict, Santiago de Cuba. They fought in the Battle of El Caney under General Joaquín Vara del Rey.

Uniform 

During the Spanish War of Independence the unit wore a blue coat with scarlet cuffs, collar, lapels, turnbacks, gold piping and buff breeches. Like all regiments at the start of the Peninsular War they wore a red plume on their hat to show their loyalty to the Bourbon monarch, Ferdinand VII of Spain, instead of the Joseph Bonaparte. In 1807 the regiment wore a blue coatee with scarlet cuffs, collar and lapels, white turnbacks, and yellow piping and had brass buttons, they also wore blue breeches. The troopers wore a black bicorn hat with gold lace and a red cockade with a gold cockade loop.

In 1898 the regiment had a uniform of a light blue dolman with black Austrian loops and white metal buttons; red collar and cuffs, and red trousers with a light blue stripe. They had also, after the Napoleonic Wars adopted the use of a cuirass and helmet, of steel with brass ornamentation. However, in the colonies of Cuba, Puerto Rico, Guam, the Las Carolinas Islands and the Philippines they wore the Rayadillo colonial uniform with red collar and cuffs and Leopoldina shakos with the Spanish red and yellow cockade.

References

Regiments of Spain
Cavalry regiments
Military units and formations of the Peninsular War
Military units and formations of the Spanish–American War